A government-organized non-governmental organization (GONGO) is a non-governmental organization that was set up or sponsored by a government in order to further its political interests and mimic the civic groups and civil society at home, or promote its international or geopolitical interests abroad.

History 

The term GONGO had become established by the late 1980s, and it was suggested that it was first introduced by a group of Indonesian non-governmental organizations.

Most contemporary attempts to understand GONGOs have come from studies of authoritarian contexts, where these organizations have proliferated as a deliberative strategy by the state to have a (corporatist) mechanism that feeds directly into a grassroots civic space. It is thus unsurprising that the current theorizing on the nature of GONGOs primarily highlights their role in undermining liberal democratic values. The Chinese Communist Party's United Front system is an example of such use of GONGOs.

Goals 

A GONGO can be created for any sound political or social purpose, however, in reality, it would be functioning as a mechanism of the government to further its domestic political interests and realize its economic and foreign policy objectives. Sometimes, GONGOs are created to solicit international aid, or mitigate specific humanitarian issues. Though not necessarily confined to developing countries, most often, GONGOs are set up by undemocratic governments to maintain some level of control of a GONGO's personnel, purpose, operation or activities. This control is often not seen in a positive light, as it compromises the spirit of an NGO by introducing hidden actors and withholding the government's intentions from the public.

Examples 

Examples of government-organized non-governmental organization:

 Chinese Students and Scholars Association
 Confucius Institute
 National Endowment for Democracy (NED)
 World Without Nazism
Amnesty International

See also 

 Gray propaganda
 Quasi-autonomous non-governmental organisation

References

Further reading 

 Cumming, Lawrence S. GONGOs. In Anheier, Helmut K, and Stefan Toepler. International Encyclopedia of Civil Society. Berlin: Springer, 2010.
 Naim, Moises. What is a Gongo. In Mansbach, Richard W., and Edward Rhodes. Global Politics in a Changing World: A Reader. Belmont, CA: Wadsworth / Cengage Learning, 2009.
 Sharma, Aradhana. Logics of Empowerment: Development, Gender, and Governance in Neoliberal India. Minneapolis: University of Minnesota Press, 2008.

External links 

 Definition for a GONGO, The New York Times, October 29, 2010.

Government agencies